Ballplayers House is a  building in Central Park in Manhattan, New York City, designed by the architecture firm Buttrick White & Burtis. Completed in 1990, it replaced an older building, architect Calvert Vaux's Boys Play House of 1868, which stood on the northern edge of the Heckscher Ballfields until it was demolished in 1969.

Design

The Ballplayers House recalls Vaux's design, albeit much altered in form and detail. In contrast to the brick and bluestone facade of Vaux's building, with its pointed arches and polychrome voussoirs, the facade of Ballplayers House is composed with graphic stripes of highly contrasting brick. In lieu of Vaux's bracketed eaves, pointed pinnacles and chamfered chimney, the new building boasts a simple roofline, topped with a sleek, factory-made metal cresting.

The Ballplayers House is decorated with an encaustic tile frieze with a simple flower motif symbolizing a ball-field, and a zig-zag pattern symbolizing a bouncing ball, designed by William W. Braham and fabricated by Brenda Bertin. In 2007, Elizabeth Barlow Rogers, head of the Central Park Conservancy when the Ballplayers House was built, described its design as "a contemporary interpretation of Vaux's style."

Historic gallery

References

Central Park
Buildings and structures in Manhattan
Postmodern architecture in New York City
New Classical architecture